Santa Ovaia e Vila Pouca da Beira is a civil parish in the municipality of Oliveira do Hospital, Portugal. It was formed in 2013 by the merger of the former parishes Santa Ovaia and Vila Pouca da Beira. The population in 2011 was 952, in an area of 7.43 km².

References

Freguesias of Oliveira do Hospital